Ferdinand Gamper (September 12, 1957 – March 1, 1996), known as The Monster of Merano, was a serial killer in South Tyrol, Italy. He killed six people in Merano during 1996, before he died.

Biography
Born into a family devoted to pastoralism, Gamper's childhood and adolescence was characterized by poverty and work in the fields.

Many described him as a shy person, with a tendency to isolate himself, while others portrayed him as a mentally ill man. As a child he was sexually abused by his father, and perhaps for this reason he was unable to have a normal approach towards women. Gamper spent many years working as a pastor in Switzerland, then returned home, finding employment in a hayloft in Riffian.

With a criminal record for contempt, resistance of a public official and public intoxication, he began to develop anti-Italian feelings from an early age, so  much so that he joined Ein Tyrol, a secessionist terrorist group, which claimed the annexation of South Tyrol to Austria. Moreover, Gamper did not even know the Italian language.

Two events marked the collapse of his already-disturbed psyche: the 1989 suicide of younger brother Richard, then the death of his father.

The murders
The first of the murders he committed took place on February 8, 1996, in Merano, where, with a gunshot to the back of the head, he killed 61-year-old Hans-Otto Detmering, an official for the Deutsche Bundesbank, and his Italian mistress, 50-year-old Clorinda Cecchetti: both were killed while walking along the Passer stream. At first it was thought to be of an economic-patrimonial motive, linked to a private matter of the German banker. It was also suggested to be a crime of passion, for which Detmering's wife was a suspect, but the investigative hypothesis remained unanswered.

On February 14, in the Merano area of Sinigo, a 58-year-old farmer, Umberto Marchioro, was shot in the head near his home. The weapon turned out to be the same one used in the murder of the two lovers; the method of execution was identical. In the face of such evidence, the investigative authority began to formulate the hypothesis that a serial killer could be the culprit. A few days later, a young drug-addicted blogger, Luca Nobile, was arrested on charges of being the perpetrator of the murders.

On February 27, in the center of Merano, 36-year-old accountant Paolo Vecchiolini was killed while walking with his girlfriend. The method and weapon used for the murder were the same as the previous ones. Despite the shocking attack, the girlfriend managed to provide the investigators with a facial composite, which described a tall, blonde man in overalls, carrying a rucksack. This new murder led the investigators to resume the murder trail, which exonerated Luca Nobile from any involvement.

On the morning of March 1, another murder took place in Riffian. The victim was a neighbor of the South Tyrolean killer, 58-year-old bricklayer Tullio Melchiorri, who was shot in the forehead. After a series of testimonies and reports, the investigators managed to identify a potential suspect who lived in the area.

Near the body of Melchiorri were found two sheets containing sentences in German with racist and delusional content: "Italian pig, you settled in South Tyrol" and "I am an Italian emigrant, or Nazi, I am only responsible for infanticide. You have arrived late." (the latter was found by carabiniers near the crime scene). Gamper had fled and taken refuge in his farm. Marshal Guerrino Botte tried to approach the hiding Gamper, but was hit with a bullet to the face. After an intervention by Criminalpol and the state police, a firefight broke out. The seriously wounded sergeant was transported to a hospital in Bolzano, where he died shortly after.

Suicide
During the siege, a shot was heard from inside the farm. At this point, the authorities broke in and found the lifeless body of Ferdinand Gamper, who had committed suicide with a gunshot to the head. The agents had no doubts that he was the Monster of Merano, who had terrified the population of the South Tyrolean city, especially those who spoke the Italian language.  The weapon used by Gamper was a Weihrauch .22 caliber Magnum rifle with a sawed-off barrel and butt to make it concealable in a backpack which he carried with him, which later turned out to be the same weapon used in all six of the murders.

Possible motive for the murders
After Gamper's suicide, the investigators continued to deepen their knowledge of the killer's personality. In the beginning it was believed that the murders were committed solely because of schizophrenia, but this pathology had not been diagnosed by a doctor, so much that the name Gamper was not included in any list of mentally ill patients in the Bolzano province.

Ethnic and racial hatred was then taken into consideration. Gamper, as noticed by the few people that knew him well, openly hated the Italians and seemed to be a pure misogynist. The victims of his murders were mainly males of Italian nationality, except for Detmering, who was a German citizen, but the killer was probably deceived by the fact that the banker was speaking in Italian to his lover.

Media emphasis
The story of the "Monster of Merano" received particular attention from the mass media, especially the German ones. The German press, in particular, had always insisted on ethnic hatred as a motive for the murders carried out by Gamper.

The story of Ferdinand Gamper highlighted the difficult situation which made the coexistence in South Tyrol between the German and the Italian linguistic groups a problem for many decades.

See also
List of serial killers by country

References

Bibliography

External links
 Biography of the serial killer Ferdinand Gamper, on elvezio-sciallis.blogspot.com.

1957 births
1996 suicides
Anti-Italian sentiment
Italian serial killers
Male serial killers
Murder in Italy
People from Merano
Suicides by firearm in Italy